Steve Bancroft (born October 6, 1970) is a Canadian former professional ice hockey player. Selected 21st overall in the 1989 NHL Entry Draft by the Toronto Maple Leafs, he played in 6 NHL games with the Chicago Blackhawks and San Jose Sharks.

Bancroft grew up in the small Ontario community of Madoc, Ontario playing his minor hockey for the local Madoc Minor Hockey Association clubs from novice to bantam.  He competed in several OMHA championship series before elevating to the Jr.C. level with his hometown Madoc Hurricanes in 1985–86.  That same season, he also spent time playing at the Jr.B. level with the Trenton Golden Hawks.

The following year, Bancroft moved to St. Catharines, Ontario and played for the St. Catharines Falcons Jr. B team of the Golden Horseshoes League of the OHA.

Bancroft retired from professional hockey in 2006 and is now a real estate agent for Century 21 in Madoc, Ontario.

Career statistics

References

External links

1970 births
Augsburger Panther players
Belleville Bulls players
Binghamton Senators players
Businesspeople from Toronto
Canadian expatriate ice hockey players in Germany
Canadian ice hockey defencemen
Canadian people of English descent
Canadian real estate agents
Chicago Blackhawks players
Chicago Wolves (IHL) players
Cincinnati Cyclones (IHL) players
Cleveland Barons (2001–2006) players
Cleveland Lumberjacks players
Detroit Vipers players
Fort Wayne Komets players
Houston Aeros (1994–2013) players
Indianapolis Ice players
Kentucky Thoroughblades players
Las Vegas Thunder players
Living people
Maine Mariners players
Moncton Hawks players
National Hockey League first-round draft picks
Newmarket Saints players
Omaha Ak-Sar-Ben Knights players
People from Hastings County
Providence Bruins players
Saint John Flames players
San Jose Sharks players
Ice hockey people from Toronto
St. John's Maple Leafs players
Toronto Maple Leafs draft picks
Worcester IceCats players